The Z.C.B.J. Tolstoj Lodge No. 224, also known as Bohemian Hall or Tolstoj Sokol Lodge, is a historic building in rural Linn County southeast of Scio, Oregon, United States, that was built in 1911. It was listed on the National Register of Historic Places on September 14, 1995. It historically served as a meeting hall for the Czech community.  The lodge organized a Czech school, in addition to hosting concerts, dances, Sokol events and Fourth of July celebrations.

The building is on Richardson Gap Road, which is named for a gap between Franklin Butte and Rodgers Mountain that separates the valleys of Thomas and Crabtree creeks.

See also
 Zapadni Ceska Bratrska Jednota
 Czech-Slovak Protective Society

References

External links

  NRHP Registration Form
 
 Historic images of Z.C.B.J. Tolstoj Lodge No. 224 from the University of Oregon digital collections
 Historic images of the Bohemian Hall Covered Bridge a former nearby bridge crossing Crabtree Creek named for the Z.C.B.J. lodge

Czech-American culture in Oregon
Western Fraternal Life Association
National Register of Historic Places in Linn County, Oregon
Buildings and structures in Linn County, Oregon
Clubhouses on the National Register of Historic Places in Oregon
Sokol in the United States
Buildings and structures completed in 1911
1911 establishments in Oregon